Sylhet Cadet College is a military high school for boys (Grade VII - XII) situated in Sylhet City, east to the Osmani Air Port Road, beside Parjatan hotel of Sylhet.

History
When Bangladesh (as East Pakistan) was part of Pakistan, Pakistan Army established some cadet colleges in West Pakistan (now Pakistan) and four cadet colleges in East Pakistan (now Bangladesh) in the form of British Public Schools. After the liberation war, Bangladesh Army established eight more cadet colleges (among them Mymensingh Girls Cadet College 1983, Joypurhat Girls Cadet College 2006, Feni Girls Cadet College 2006 had been established for girls). Sylhet Cadet College is the first cadet college established after the liberation War of Bangladesh in 1971. It was established in Pakistan as a model school in 1969. In 1974, it was modified and converted to a model college. Bangladesh Army modified this model college and converted it to a cadet college in 1978. In 1979, An admission test took place for selecting the students from model college to keep them in this new modified Cadet College. First, second and third batch of this new cadet college was from the model college, and in the same year 4th Batch was taken as fresh cadets. First Batch passed the college in 1982 and first intake, i.e. fourth batch, passed in 1985. And from that time, an admission test started taking place every year to admit new cadets in class seven.''

See also
List of cadet colleges in Pakistan
Cadet College Club Limited

Infrastructure
House: 
The three houses are on the same building. On the ground floor there is Titumir House, on 1st floor Hazrat Shahjalal (R:) house and on the 2nd floor is the Surma house. There are 34 rooms in each house in 3 different blocks. Each House has 31 rooms for the living of cadets. The remaining rooms are reserved for House Office, House Store, and Duty Master's Room in case of Titumir House And mobile room for other two houses.

Dining hall
A large dining space for the cadets, located just beside the house. The dining hall is named Birsrestho Matiur Rahman dining hall.

Hospital
Birsrestho Nur Mohammad hospital is situated on South-eastern corner of the college adjacent to the Athletics Ground. It is a single-story building. Cadets including other members of the college can report to the hospital in case of sickness or an injury. A Captain/Major of Bangladesh Army is usually in charge of the hospital.

Auditorium
A large auditorium is there adjacent to the academic block. The auditorium is named after Birshrestho Mostofa Kamal. All the competitions, cultural shows and Assembly are held here.

Houses

Academics
Sylhet Cadet College has been providing great academic support to the cadets to make them a perfect man for the service of the nation. Recently SCC has made a brilliant result in Secondary School Certificate (SSC) examination, 2007 (28th) and 2010 (31st). They all achieved GPA 5.00. The academic performance of SCC is always on the increase. The result of SCC has always been best in Sylhet Education Board.

Administration
Administration of this college is run by Principal (Colonel or equivalent defense official or professor of Cadet College), Vice principal (professor of Cadet College), Adjutant (Major or equivalent defense official), Medical Officer (Captain/Major or equivalent defense official) and three House Masters (Associate professor of Cadet College).
Current Administration:
Principal: Professor Md. Wahid Ullah,
Adjutant:Maj Sheikh Rashshad Rahman (Ex-Cadet of 27th batch, SCC),
Medical Officer: Maj Omar Faruk Fahad.

See also
 Cadet Colleges in Bangladesh
 Cadet Colleges in Pakistan

Colleges in Sylhet District
Education in Sylhet
Cadet colleges in Bangladesh
Educational Institutions affiliated with Bangladesh Army
Educational institutions established in 1978
1978 establishments in Bangladesh